The 1899 Louisville Colonels baseball team finished with a 75–77 record and ninth place in the National League. Following the season, owner Barney Dreyfuss bought the Pittsburgh Pirates organization and folded his Louisville team. Manager Fred Clarke and most of the players moved over to the Pirates where they enjoyed much more success in the coming years.  The Colonels, a perennial also-ran through their National League run from 1892 to 1899, appeared to be on the cusp of becoming a strong team when the National League contracted from 12 teams to 8 after the end of the 1899 season.  Louisville started the season with a 15–37 record after 52 games, but then went 60–40 in their last 100 in the first glimpse of what was to become a strong Pirates team in the years to come.  Many star players, including several Hall of Famers, of the first decade of the 20th Century came from the 1899 Louisville squad including Clarke, Honus Wagner, Rube Waddell, Deacon Phillippe, Tommy Leach and Claude Ritchey.

Regular season

Season standings

Record vs. opponents

Opening Day lineup

Roster

Player stats

Batting

Starters by position
Note: Pos = Position; G = Games played; AB = At bats; H = Hits; Avg. = Batting average; HR = Home runs; RBI = Runs batted in

Other batters
Note: G = Games played; AB = At bats; H = Hits; Avg. = Batting average; HR = Home runs; RBI = Runs batted in

Pitching

Starting pitchers
Note: G = Games pitched; IP = Innings pitched; W = Wins; L = Losses; ERA = Earned run average; SO = Strikeouts

Other pitchers
Note: G = Games pitched; IP = Innings pitched; W = Wins; L = Losses; ERA = Earned run average; SO = Strikeouts

Relief pitchers
Note: G = Games pitched; W = Wins; L = Losses; SV = Saves; ERA = Earned run average; SO = Strikeouts

References
 1899 Louisville Colonels team page at Baseball Reference

Louisville Colonels seasons
Louisville Colonels season
Louisville Colonels